Lost in the Ozone is an album by American rock band Commander Cody and His Lost Planet Airmen.  Their first album, it was released in 1971.  it contains their hit cover version of "Hot Rod Lincoln" as well as the band's live staples "Lost in the Ozone" and "Seeds and Stems (Again)".

Critical reception

On AllMusic, Jana Pendragon said, "This is the monumental debut by one of insurgent country's pioneer bands. Playing with electric instruments, including the all important steel and fiddle, and a good dose of irreverence allowed the band to adhere to their own agenda. This first release was only a taste of the things to come."

Robert Christgau said, "Cody takes the country-rock idea that good old boys form a secret counterculture to bleary new heights. Uprooted bozos who handle fast cars and hot music (or vice versa) a lot better than wimmin and booze, they're half at home in every renegade country tradition, rockabilly and Western swing and white boogie-woogie."

Track listing
Side A
"Back to Tennessee" (Billy C. Farlow, George Frayne) – 2:45
"Wine Do Yer Stuff" (Farlow, Frayne) – 3:03
"Seeds and Stems (Again)" (Farlow, Frayne) – 3:45
"Daddy's Gonna Treat You Right"  (Farlow) – 3:00
"Family Bible"  (Paul Buskirk, Walt Breeland, Claude Gray) – 3:39
"Home in My Hand"  (Ronnie Self) – 2:52
Side B
"Lost in the Ozone"  (Farlow) – 2:07
"Midnight Shift"  (Earl Lee, Jimmie Ainsworth,) – 2:27
"Hot Rod Lincoln"  (Charlie Ryan, W.S. Stevenson) – 2:44
"What's the Matter Now?" [live] (Farlow) – 4:02
"Twenty Flight Rock" [live] (Ned Fairchild) – 2:57
"Beat Me Daddy, Eight to the Bar" [live] (Don Raye, Hughie Prince, Eleanore Sheehy) – 5:08

Personnel
Commander Cody and His Lost Planet Airmen
Commander Cody (George Frayne) – piano, lead vocals on "Hot Rod Lincoln"
John Tichy – rhythm guitar, harmony vocals, lead vocals on "Family Bible" and "Beat Me Daddy"
Andy Stein – fiddle, saxophone
Lance Dickerson – drums
"Buffalo" Bruce Barlow – Fender bass, acoustic bass on "Midnight Shift", harmony vocals
Bill Kirchen – lead guitar, trombone, harmony vocals, lead vocals on "Seeds and Stems" and "Home in My Hand"
Billy C. Farlow – lead vocals, harmonica
West Virginia Creeper (Steve Davis) – pedal steel guitar
Jack Black - backing vocals, guitar on "What's the Matter Now?"
Production
Bob Cohen – producer, engineer
Commander Cody (George Frayne) – producer
Phil Sawyer – mixing
Chris Frayne – front cover
Dennis Anderson – rear cover photograph
Studio cuts recorded at Pacific High Recording, San Francisco
"What's the Matter Now?" and "20 Flight Rock" recorded live at the Long Branch Saloon and New Monk in Berkeley, July 1971
"Beat Me Daddy" recorded at Ann Arbor, Michigan by Morgan Sound, April 1971

Chart positions

Weekly charts
Album

Singles

Year-end charts

References

Commander Cody and His Lost Planet Airmen albums
1971 debut albums
Paramount Records (1969) albums
MCA Records albums
Albums produced by George Frayne